Hell's Island is a 1930 American pre-Code drama film directed by Edward Sloman and starring Jack Holt, Ralph Graves and Dorothy Sebastian.

The film's sets were designed by the art director Harrison Wiley.

Plot
The story focuses on two Americans serving in the French Foreign Legion in North Africa. One of whom is sentenced to serve nine years on Devil's Island.

Cast
 Jack Holt as Mac 
 Ralph Graves as Griff 
 Dorothy Sebastian as Marie 
 Richard Cramer as Sgt. Klotz 
 Harry Allen as Bert, the Cockney
 Lionel Belmore as Monsieur Dupont 
 Otto Lang as German Legionnaire 
 Carl Stockdale as Colonel

References

Bibliography
 Munden, Kenneth White. The American Film Institute Catalog of Motion Pictures Produced in the United States, Part 1. University of California Press, 1997.

External links
 

1930 films
1930 drama films
1930s English-language films
American drama films
Films directed by Edward Sloman
Columbia Pictures films
Films set in Algeria
Films about the French Foreign Legion
1930s American films